Martin Heights is an unincorporated community in Washington Township, Washington County, in the U.S. state of Indiana.

It is located within the city limits of Salem.

Geography

References

Unincorporated communities in Washington County, Indiana
Unincorporated communities in Indiana